Allen Paul Wikgren (3 December 1906 – 7 May 1998) was an American New Testament scholar and professor at the University of Chicago. His work centered on the text of the New Testament and New Testament manuscripts, but also included Hellenistic and biblical Greek, the deuterocanonical books (apocrypha), early Jewish literature (particularly Josephus), and work on the Revised Standard Version English translation of the Bible.

Education 

Wikgren earned his Bachelor of Arts degree (cum laude) in Greek in 1928, his Master of Arts degree in 1929 and his Ph.D. in 1932, all from the University of Chicago. His doctoral dissertation was entitled A Comparative Study of the Theodotionic and Septuagint Versions of Daniel.

Biography 

An ordained minister in the mainline Northern Baptist Convention, Wikgren then served as a minister at First Baptist Church in Belleville, Kansas and as a professor of New Testament literature at Kansas City Baptist Theological Seminary (now Central Baptist Theological Seminary in Shawnee, Kansas) (1935-1937) and of biblical literature and classics at Ottawa University in Ottawa, Kansas (1937-1940) before returning to Chicago to join the University of Chicago Divinity School as the J. M. Powis Smith Instructor in 1940. At Chicago, Wikgren was a member of the Department of New Testament and Early Christian Literature in the university's Division of the Humanities, a department which he would later serve as chair. His colleagues in New Testament studies during his long tenure administering the department (1953-1972) included figures such as Norman Perrin, Robert M. Grant and Markus Barth.

Perhaps Wikgren's most widely known contribution to the study of the New Testament was his role, together with Kurt Aland, Matthew Black, Carlo Maria Martini and Bruce M. Metzger, on the editorial committee that established the Greek text and critical apparatuses in the standard hand editions of the Greek New Testament: the Nestle-Aland Novum Testamentum Graece (26th edition, published by the Deutsche Bibelgesellschaft first in 1979 and revised in 1983) and the United Bible Societies' The Greek New Testament (3rd edition, published by the United Bible Societies in 1983).

Wikgren served as president of the Chicago Society of Biblical Research in 1951–1952. He was a member of the Revised Standard Version (RSV) committee from 1952, participating in the translation of the deuterocanonical books and the revision of the New Testament. And he was director of the Chicago Lectionary Project from 1958 to 1972. He also held visiting professorships at a number of universities: Indiana University–Gary, Pacific School of Religion (Berkeley, California), University of Ghana, Århus University, Concordia Theological Seminary (Springfield, Illinois [now back in Fort Wayne, Indiana]) and Uppsala University.

Works

Thesis

Books

as Editor

Festschriften

References

External links
 In memoriam: Allen Wikgren, The University of Chicago Chronicle, 11 June 1998 (vol. 17, no. 18)

1906 births
1998 deaths
Clergy from Chicago
American biblical scholars
New Testament scholars
University of Chicago alumni
University of Chicago Divinity School faculty
Ottawa University faculty
Translators of the Bible into English
20th-century translators
American people of Swedish descent
20th-century Baptist ministers from the United States